The 1930 Western Illinois Leathernecks football team represented Western Illinois State Teachers College—now known as Western Illinois University—as a member of the Illinois Intercollegiate Athletic Conference (IIAC) during the 1930 college football season. Led by fifth-year head coach Ray Hanson, the Leathernecks compiled and overall record of 4–4 with a mark of 3–4 in conference play, placing 15th in the IIAC.

Schedule

References

Western Illinois
Western Illinois Leathernecks football seasons
Western Illinois Leathernecks football